Red Bluff Dam is a dam in the Pecos River, situated about  north of Pecos, Texas. Its Red Bluff Reservoir was formed in 1936 by the dam construction, organized by the Red Bluff Water Control District to provide water for irrigation and hydroelectric power.

Planning and construction

A water user's association was formed to promote the dam in 1916, and surveying began in 1921. In 1924 the states of Texas and New Mexico agreed to allow construction, and in 1926 President Calvin Coolidge approved the plan. In 1927 the Red Bluff Water Control District was formed to manage the project from seven existing water districts. In 1934 the loan for construction was approved by the Public Works Administration. The dam was completed in September 1936, and started to supply water in 1937.

Structure

The spillway is concrete ogee controlled by 12 tainter gates, each . The dam includes two hydroelectric plants with a combined capacity of 2,300 kilowatts.

Water from the dam irrigates  of farmland.

References 
Citations

Sources

Dams in Texas
Buildings and structures in Loving County, Texas
Buildings and structures in Reeves County, Texas
Dams completed in 1936
Dams on the Pecos River
Pecos, Texas
1936 establishments in Texas